Ali Masykur Musa (born September 12, 1962) is an Indonesian politician who serves as current chairman of Central Board of NU's Scholars Association (PP ISNU). He is also current member of the Supreme Audit Agency of the Republic of Indonesia (BPK RI) and appointed as official candidate for chairman of The Working Group on Environmental Auditing (WGEA), under the International Organization of Supreme Audit Institutions (INTOSAI). Ali had close relationship with former president and co-founder of National Awakening Party (PKB), Abdurrahman “Gus Dur” Wahid, and was twice elected as chairman of the party's faction in the House of Representatives in 2002 and 2006.

Early life and organization
Ali Masykur Musa was born on 12 September 1962 in Tulungagung regency of East Java. His parents were Kiyai Hadji Musa Asy’ari, a local priest, and Hadjah Muthmainnah. He was the fourth of 5 children.

After completing high school and Pondok Pesantren (Indonesians' Islamic Boarding School), he attended the International Relations department, Social and Politic Science Faculty of Jember University, East Java. He became active in Indonesian Islamic Student Movement (PMII) and was running for local chairman of Jember regency branch from 1985 to 1986. In 1991, he was elected as chairman of Central Board of PMII. He was also appointed as deputy chairman of GP Ansor, the youth wing of Indonesia's Nahdlatul Ulama (NU), Jember regency branch in 1986. He was elected as Chairman of the Indonesian National Youth Committee (KNPI) from 1999 to 2000. In the Nahdlatul Ulama leadership board (PB NU), he held the position of chairman of Economic Institution department from 2000 to 2005. Since 2012, he serves as chairman of Central Board of NU's Scholars Association (PP ISNU).

Political career
Member of National Awakening Party (PKB) Faction at the House of Representatives of the Republic of Indonesia (DPR RI) 1999-2001
Chairman of National Awakening Party (PKB) Faction at the House of Representatives of the Republic of Indonesia (DPR RI) 2002-2003 and 2004-2006
Secretary of Ad Hoc Committee of the People's Consultative Assembly (PAH I BP MPR) 2000-2003
Member of Working committee on the Organization of Islamic Conference (OKI) Parliament 2002-2005
Member of the Indonesian House of Representatives’ Inter-parliamentary Cooperation Committee (BKSAP DPR-RI) 1999-2003
Member of Commission IX, the House of Representatives (DPR-RI) 1999-2002
Member of Commission VI, the House of Representatives (DPR-RI) 2002-2003
Deputy Chairman of Commission IX, the House of Representatives (DPR-RI) 2003-2004
Deputy Chairman of Commission XI, the House of Representatives (DPR-RI) 2004-2006
Member of the House Legislative Committee (Baleg DPR-RI) 2005-2009
Member of Commission XI, the House of Representatives (DPR -RI) 2006-2009
Member IV of The Supreme Audit Agency of Republic of Indonesia (BPK-RI) 2009-2014
Chairman of Working Committee  INTOSAI WGEA on The Supreme Audit Agency of Republic of Indonesia (BPK-RI) 2013-2016

Education
Bachelor of Social Sciences (S.Sos.) in International Relations department, Social and Politic Science Faculty (FISIP) of Jember University 1986
Study-Internship of “Area Studies”, Inter-university Center (PAU), Gadjah Mada University (UGM) 1987
Study-Internship of “International Relations Method and International Political Economic”, Inter-university Center (PAU), University of Indonesia (UI) 1988
Master of Humaniora (M.Hum.) in Political Science, University of Indonesia 1998
Ph.D. (Dr.) in Management of Education, Policy Studies and Budget Politics, Jakarta State University (UNJ) 2007
Master of Science (M.Si.) in Business Law, Gadjah Mada University (UGM) 2009
Bachelor of Law (S.H.), Law Faculty of Sahid University (Jakarta) 2010
Comparative study of state, law, and civics in several countries such as South Korea, China, Japan, Chile, USA, Saudi Arabia, Egypt, Germany, Switzerland, Spain, *Brazil, Argentina, Morocco, Greece, Russia, etc.

References 

1962 births
Indonesian politicians
Living people